Cem Akdağ (born March 18, 1956) is a Turkish professional basketball coach. He is currently head coach of Eskişehir Basket.

References

External links
 Cem Akdağ at FIBAEurope.com

1956 births
Living people
Basketbol Süper Ligi head coaches
Beşiktaş basketball coaches
Galatasaray S.K. (men's basketball) coaches
Turkish basketball coaches
Turkish men's basketball players